Samuel Lamb or Lin Xiangao (October 4, 1924 – August 3, 2013) was a Protestant pastor in Guangzhou, China. He was a leader in the Chinese house church movement and known for his resistance against the state-sanctioned Three-Self Patriotic Movement (TSPM).

Biography
Lamb was born in a mountainous area overlooking Macau. His father, Paul Lamb, was the pastor of a small Baptist congregation. In the 1940s, Lamb worked with pastor Wang Mingdao.

Lamb was imprisoned for more than 20 years (1955–57; 1958–78) for his refusal to join the TSPM. In spite of "honey-bucket" duty at labor farms or backbreaking work in coal mines at labor camps, Lamb continued to teach.

In 1978, Lamb was released from prison and, in 1979, he restarted the church in 35 Da Ma Zhan, Guangzhou. Because the attendance grew quickly, he then moved the meetings to 15 Rong Gui Li, De Zheng Bei Road. The house church is now known as Rongguili Church, under the name Damazhan Evangelical Church. The house church continued to hold four main services each week, with an estimated attendance of four to five thousand, but was closed on October 14, 2018, and a second time on December 15, 2018.

Starting in 1979, Lamb published a series of booklets called "Voice of the Spirit"; now there are more than 200 booklets.

He died in Guangzhou in 2013, aged 88. For reasons of security and site elements, the date of the farewell ceremony was changed from August 17, 2013 to August 16, 2013, in Baiyun Hall, Yinhe park, Yinhe cemetery, Guangzhou. There were nearly 30,000 mourners in attendance.

Views 
Lamb preached theologically conservative teachings. His refusal to register his church with the Chinese government and join the TSPM was due to his strong support of the separation of church and state.

See also

 House church (China)
 Protestantism in China

References

1924 births
2013 deaths
Chinese Protestants
Evangelists
Chinese prisoners and detainees
Prisoners and detainees of the People's Republic of China
Chinese Protestant ministers and clergy